Homonota darwinii, also known commonly as Darwin's marked gecko or the prickly gecko, is a species of lizard in the family Phyllodactylidae. The species is endemic to Argentina. There are two recognized subspecies.

Etymology
The specific name, darwinii, is in honor of English naturalist Charles Darwin, author of On the Origin of Species.

Habitat
The preferred natural habitats of H. darwinii are grassland, shrubland, and forest.

Reproduction
H. darwinii is oviparous.

Subspecies
Two subspecies are recognized as being valid, including the nominotypical subspecies.

Homonota darwinii darwinii 
Homonota darwinii macrocephala

References

Further reading
Boulenger GA (1885). Catalogue of the Lizards in the British Museum (Natural History). Second Edition. Volume I. Geckonidæ .... London: Trustees of the British Museum (Natural History). (Taylor and Francis, printers). xii + 436 pp. + Plates I–XXXII. (Homonota darwinii, new species, pp. 21–22 + Plate III, figures 7, 7a, 7b).
Cei JM (1978). "Homonota darwinii macrocephala, n. subsp., del noroeste de Argentina (Sauria, Gekkonidae)". Publicaciones Ocasionales, Instituto de Biologia Animal, Universidad Nacional de Cuyo, Mendoza Argentina (4): 1–4. (Homonota darwinii macrocephala, new subspecies). (in Spanish).
Pérez CH, Minoli I (2014). "Depredación de Homonota darwinii Laurent, 1984 [sic] (Squamata: Phyllodactylidae) por Bothriurus burmeisteri Kraepelin, 1894 (Scorpiones: Bothriuridae) en la Provincia del Chubut, Argentina". Cuadernos de Herpetología 28 (2): 1–2. (in Spanish).

Homonota
Endemic fauna of Argentina
Reptiles of Argentina
Reptiles described in 1885
Taxa named by George Albert Boulenger